Statue of Alexander von Humboldt may refer to:

 Statue of Alexander von Humboldt (Begas)
 Statue of Alexander von Humboldt (Bläser)
 Statue of Alexander von Humboldt (Chicago)
 Statue of Alexander von Humboldt (Mexico City)
 Statue of Alexander von Humboldt (Philadelphia)
 Statue of Alexander von Humboldt (Stanford University)